Kuruwitha Army Camp is a military base located in Kuruwita close to the town of Ratnapura in the Sabaragamuwa Province of Sri Lanka. It serves as the regimental headquarters of the Gemunu Watch of Sri Lanka Army.

See also
Gemunu Watch

References

Sri Lankan Army bases
Buildings and structures in Sabaragamuwa Province